Stanko Lopatić (born 21 January 1956) is a Yugoslav judoka. He competed in the men's middleweight event at the 1984 Summer Olympics.

References

1956 births
Living people
Yugoslav male judoka
Olympic judoka of Yugoslavia
Judoka at the 1984 Summer Olympics
Place of birth missing (living people)